John Vince (31 December 1849 – 5 May 1886) was an English cricketer. Vince was a right-handed batsman who bowled right-arm fast. He was born at Hackbridge, Surrey.

Vince made his first-class debut for Surrey against the Marylebone Cricket Club in 1870 at Lord's. He made ten further first-class appearances for the county in 1870, the last of which came against the Marylebone Cricket Club at The Oval. Primarily a bowler, Vince took 15 wickets at an average of 30.26, with best figures of 4/58. With the bat, he scored 60 runs at a batting average of 2.85, with a high score of 10 not out.

He died at Beddington, Surrey, on 5 May 1886.

References

External links
John Vince at ESPNcricinfo
John Vince at CricketArchive

1849 births
1886 deaths
People from Sutton, London
English cricketers
Surrey cricketers